Rita Luna (1770–1832), was a Spanish stage actress. She is regarded as the leading female stage actor of the Spanish stage of her time.

Notes

1770 births
1832 deaths
18th-century Spanish actresses
Spanish stage actresses